Anita Lucette DeFrantz (born October 4, 1952) is an American Olympic rower, member of the International Olympic Committee, and twice Vice-President of International Rowing Federation (FISA).

Biography
DeFrantz was born in 1952 in Philadelphia, USA. A member of the Vesper Boat Club in her home city, she was captain of the American rowing team at the 1976 Summer Olympics winning the bronze medal in women's eight. In 1980, the United States boycotted the 1980 Olympic Games in Moscow, USSR: DeFrantz qualified as part of the 1980 U.S. Olympic team, but she was unable to compete. She was one of 461 athletes to receive a Congressional Gold Medal.

Board member
In 1986, the International Olympic Committee (IOC) appointed DeFrantz to membership in the organization. She became the first chair of the prototype of the IOC Women in Sport Commission in 1992, and the first female vice-president of the IOC executive committee in 1997, serving until 2001. On June 25, 2012, DeFrantz told AroundTheRings.com that she would like to return to the IOC Executive Committee. She was elected back onto the IOC Executive Board on September 10, 2013 and she was elected to a four-year term as IOC Vice President at the 131st IOC Session in Lima, Peru on September 15, 2017.

DeFrantz is also on the board of the Al Oerter Foundation (AOF) which runs the Art of the Olympians (AOTO) program which is an international organization of Olympian and Paralympian artists promoting the Olympic values and ideals through educational and cultural programs and exhibitions.

Honors

In 1980, DeFrantz was awarded the Olympic Order for her contributions to the Olympic Movement. In 2017, a plaque honoring her was unveiled in the L.A. Memorial Coliseum's Court of Honor.

References

External links
Anita DeFrantz, Rowing
Comments regarding the boycott of the 1980 Summer Olympics

1952 births
Living people
Rowers from Philadelphia
International Olympic Committee members
Olympic medalists in rowing
American female rowers
Rowers at the 1976 Summer Olympics
Rowing officials
World Rowing Championships medalists for the United States
Congressional Gold Medal recipients
Recipients of the Olympic Order
Connecticut College alumni
University of Pennsylvania Law School alumni
Medalists at the 1976 Summer Olympics
Olympic bronze medalists for the United States in rowing
21st-century American women